The article is a list of characters that appear in the action sci-fi manga and anime, World Trigger.

Main characters

Coming from the Neighborhood, he has a laid back attitude, and isn't very knowledgeable of Japanese customs, leading him into confusions with the wrong people. When he was 11, he and his father  were in a war in the Neighborhood, lending their power to an old friend of his father named Raymond. In an occasion where his father told him not to follow him, Yūma disobeyed his father, sneaking into battle, which caused him to be heavily injured. Yuma's dying body is sealed in a ring that also holds his black trigger and he received a body made from Trion. His guardian, Replica, told him to go to the human world and see if Border could find a cure to his condition (though he wanted to bring his father back instead), only to find out they didn't know the answer either. In chapter 33 he officially joined Border as a C-Rank attacker in Tamakoma-2. He received the nickname  in the anime, and gets called "White Nightmare" by Kōda Squad, due to his white hair and ferocity in battle. In Season 2, Ōji gives him the nickname of "Cougar". He is a Speed Based Attacker that uses Scorpion to fight in Rank Wars. He inherited a Side Effect which enables him to accurately determine when a person is lying after getting his black trigger.

A Border agent with low Trion level. He is usually referred as simply "Four Eyes" by people outside Tamakoma-2. He became Chika's protector after her older brother (and his tutor) disappeared mysteriously, and joined Border in order to be better able to protect her, but the examiner suggested him to become an Engineer or Operator, due to his low Trion. Unable to accept this, he imprudently tried to infiltrate Border's headquarters and negotiate with them, but he was attacked by a Bamster, which was destroyed by Jin. The S-rank member then talks Border into accepting Osamu as a C-Rank trainee. He befriended Yūma after he was transferred to his school. He is 15 years old.

A girl with abnormally high Trion level, which "attracts" Trion Soldiers towards her. Her brother Rinji and friend were captured by Neighbors, and tired of running away and looking for a way to rescue them, she joins Border as a C-Rank Sniper in Tamakoma-2. She purposely keeps herself away from others because she is afraid she'll cause them to be captured by Neighbors and she doesn't want to get hurt. She also has two side effects, one that allows her to feel the presence of incoming enemies, and one to hide her presence. In Season 2, she becomes known as "Tamakoma's Cannon". She has short hair styled in a hime cut, with a cowlick in the middle. She is currently 14 years old.

Yūichi is an A-Rank Solo Attacker (originally S-Rank) at Border with precognitive powers. He is a very friendly and carefree person. He is a self-proclaimed "Talented Elite", but his skills and strategies in battle are more than enough to back up his confidence. His mother was killed by Neighbors but despite that, he doesn't hate Neighbors, as he has been to the Neighbor World and knows not all Neighbors are evil. He was the one who invited Yūma to join Border. Like Yūma's father, his mentor  sacrificed his own life to create a Black Trigger, which Yūichi competed for, and later gave it away so that Yūma could officially join and be recognized as a Border agent by Headquarters. His Side Effect allows him to see the future, which is highly valued by Border. He is 19 years old.

Yūma's guardian, created by his father to protect Yūma and teach him right from wrong. They have information on various countries that Yūma and his father visited. They was the one who told Yūma to come to the human world. Replica told Osamu Yūma's story, and asked him to give Yūma a new goal. Near the end of the large scale invasion by Aftokrator, Replica was severely damaged. While in this state Osamu throws Replica into Aftokrator's away ship, and activates the emergency launch command. While this ultimately saved Osamu and Chika, replica was unable to leave the ship. It is currently unknown if he managed to survive or if he is still "alive" or not.

Border

Tamakoma Branch
 is a faction of Border which believes Neighbors and Humans can be friends, and takes a more diplomatic approach to them. Director Rindō brought back various triggers frpm the neighborhood, which were analyzed by the engineers, and were created triggers made specifically for Tamakoma-1

The branch chief of Tamakoma Branch, a carefree and friendly man. Due to his past experiences, he learned that not all Neighbors are enemies of the Human race, and thus wants to befriend all those among them who are good. He was the pupil of Yūma's father, who guided and trained him when he was a newcomer to Border. Due to that, he feels indebted to Yūma's father and wants to give him the same treatment Yūgo has given to him. He wanted for Yūma to join Tamakoma Branch, but Yūma declined at first, later accepting to join as part of Tamakoma-2.

Tamakoma-1
 is a Team which is described as being Border's strongest team. They are prohibited to participate in Border's Rank Warsas some of their triggers are not approved by Headquarters. 2 of its 3 combatants are all-rounders, while the last one is an attacker.

The leader of the team. He is experienced as an Attacker, Gunner and Sniper, and is Chika's mentor. He is a usually calm and serious person, and is usually the one to point out to Konami that she is being tricked. He is 21 years old.

A fun-loving and cocky individual, who becomes serious in combat. He has mentored Osamu and Kitora. He likes teasing  Konami, due to her gullibility. He is 16 years old.

A wild but gullible girl. She is very credulous, and will believe almost anything people say to her. Due to that, people frequently make fun of her, principally Jin, Karasuma and later Yūma. She is 17 years old. Based on popularity polls, Konami has become a breakout character.

A nerdy girl who tends to get overconfident sometimes, which annoys Jin. She works as an operator for Jin, Tamakoma-1 and Tamakoma-2, and she used to be the operator of Kazama Squad. She is 17 years old.

Tamakoma-2
, A new team formed by Osamu Mikumo (leader), Yūma Kuga, Chika Amatori and later on, Hyuse. The Squad was formed because Chika wanted to join the Away Team and search for Chika's lost brother and friend, and because Replica asked Osamu to give Yūma a new goal. Osamu originally wanted for Yūma to be the team captain, but Yūma only accepted joining Tamakoma Branch with the condition that Osamu was the captain. Hyuse later joins the team after being marooned, on the condition Osamu brings him back to Aftokrator. They're currently No. 2 in the B-Rank ranking.

Others

The proclaimed son of Mr. Rindō. He frequently says things he shouldn't, like asking Chika to marry him. He is later on revealed to be the prince of the fallen planet known as Aristera. Yotaro also has a pet capybara called  who is also revealed to be the planet's crown trigger. According to Volume 3's extras, he has the Side Effect ability to talk to animals.

Headquarters
 is Border's main branch, led by Masamune Kido. It's the base for most of Border's teams.

The Leader of Border, a bitter man with a scarred face who seemingly hates all Neighbors (however this may only be a front), and wanted to eliminate Yūma and take his Black Trigger from him. According to Shinoda, however, he was the one closest to Yūgo and most moved by his death, despite not showing it. He is 42 years old.

The General Manager and Commander of the Self-Defense Corps of Border, who is also known as Headquarters' Strongest Normal Trigger User. Like Rindō, he was a student of Yūgo and he is 33 years old.

The Public Relations Chief, a frail-looking middle-aged man with a prominent nose who is prone to nervous outbursts. In situations of danger is always the first one to panic.

The Headquarters Research and Development Chief, a short and squat man with a short temperament, but also a deep love for the little ones. He is said to have a little daughter. He is 48 years old.

The External Affairs and Business Manager, a calm and recluse guy who prefers to listen to others. He is an avid negotiator who believes it is possible to negotiate with anyone as long as you know what they want. He is 33 years old.

Shinoda's subordinate and Border's Assistant Director and former attacke. She's a temperamental woman who is annoyed by Jin's sexual harassment. She also loves Shinoda.

Border Teams

A-Rank

Tachikawa Squad
 is one of Border's strongest teams, and No. 1 in the A-Rank ranking. Their emblem has a design with a crescent moon and three sword blades, diagonally arranged in parallel to each other.

Tachikawa is the leader of Tachikawa Squad, and Masafumi Shinoda's apprentice. He is a charismatic and cocky individual who enjoys teasing Miwa, and is also shown to be a good strategist. He is Border's No. 1 agent, and he is said to be better in true swordsmanship than Jin. He and Jin have long been rivals, and he is excited when Jin goes back to participating in the Rank Wars.

Izumi is a member of Tachikawa Squad and a reckless Shooter, who thinks blowing things up is always the best option (though luckily someone is usually around to prevent him from doing so), which earned him the nickname "bullet idiot" from Yōsuke Yoneya. He has a habit of combining his bullets into stronger ones.

Yuiga is a member of Tachikawa Squad and is a Gunner. He is the son of Border's biggest sponsor, and has a very narcissistic personality. He'd requested to be placed in an A-Rank Squad, hence being put into Tachikawa Squad by Masamune Kido. However, he lacks many skills as an A-Rank agent. Izumi had even said that his fighting is unfavourable compared to many B-Ranks.

Kunichika is Tachikawa Squad's operator, a young girl with a bright smile and messy hair. She has a strong liking for video games, as she is often seen gaming with her teammates Izumi and Tachikawa. If she loses a game, she cries.

Fuyushima Squad
 is team No. 2 in the A-Rank ranking. Their emblem is a knight chess piece with unicorn horn.

Fuyushima is the captain of Fuyushima Squad, and a Trapper. He didn't participate in the raid to take Yūma's black trigger. According to Tōma, it was because he had sea-sickness.

Tōma is a Sniper and the No. 1 Sniper in all of Border. He is an arrogant man with a pompadour who likes teasing Narasaka, the No.# 02 Sniper. He, however, is friendly and able to recognize a strong opponent. He was mentored by Azuma.

Kazama Squad
 is team No. 3 in the A-Rank ranking, who rose in the A-Rank ranking thanks to Kikuchihara's side effect. Their emblem is composed of a crossed-out eye.

The leader of Kazama Squad, an Attacker who is older than his height suggests. He is a serious and no-nonsense person, rarely showing any emotion, and is also very proud.

An All-Rounder from Kazama Squad. Unlike the stoic Kazama and the foul-mouthed Kikuchihara, he's a rather gentle and friendly person.

An Attacker from Kazama Squad. He's a foul-mouthed young boy with little respect for those he considers weak and even his teammates, and seems to consider himself more important than he really is. Despite that, he seems to be a gentle person, as according to the official World Trigger twitter he likes "friends and buddies".

The operator of Kazama Squad, who replaced Usami in that role. She is a young girl with short black hair style in a bob cut.

Kusakabe Squad
 is team No. 4 in the A-Rank ranking. Their emblem is a dragon-headed rooster, with a laurel wreath-looking design behind it.

Kusakabe is the Operator and Leader of Kusakabe Squad. 
 

Midorikawa is a 14-year-old Attacker. He is a prodigy, having reached A-Rank at such a young age, and managed to defeat a Neighbor simulation in just 4 seconds on his first try. He is shown to be arrogant, and enjoys showing off, until he is humbled by Yūma after attempting to humiliate Osamu, who he was jealous of for being recruited into Tamakoma.

Saeki is an All-rounder and member of Kusakabe Squad.

Satomi is the No. 1 Gunner and Member of Kusakabe Squad.

Uno is a Sniper and member of Kusakabe Squad.

Arashiyama Squad
 is team No. 5 in the A-Rank ranking. They are known as "the face of Border", due to their frequent appearances in Border propaganda and promotional material. Because they spend so much time doing publicity for Border, they are believed by many to be inferior to the other A-rank teams, though this has been shown to be untrue. Their emblem has a design composed of 5 small black pentagons with a white star symbol inside each, arranged so as to form another star symbol.

Jun is the leader of Arashiyama Squad and an All-Rounder. He is a fun-loving and charismatic individual and also a loving older brother to his brother  and his sister , although they are embarrassed by his overt displays of affection. He quickly befriends Osamu and Yūma after they save the students in their school, which include his siblings. He later congratulates Osamu on his promotion and Yūma for joining Border.

Ai is an All-Rounder from Arashiyama Squad who considers Osamu to be her rival (though she denies such). She's a member of Arashiyama Squad and a child prodigy, having joined Border as an A-Rank member as a Middle Schooler. She's always trying to show Osamu she's better than him, though Osamu isn't competitive about it. She does however have a gentle and humble side to her, and is willing to help anyone in need. She also seems to be interested in Osamu's growth.

Mitsuru is a boy with a bowl cut, an All-Rounder from Arashiyama Squad. He calm and quiet, unlike his teammates, and doesn't talk much unless he has something important to say.

Ken is the Sniper of Arashiyama Squad, a cocky and goofy but friendly person. Despite his funny personality, he's the only sniper able to fire two rifles simultaneously without losing any precision.

Haruka is the Operator of Arashiyama Squad, a pretty and smart girl with a bowl cut similar to Chika's but a little longer and without the cowlick.

Kako Squad
 is team No. 6 in the A-Rank ranking, and an all-girls team. Their emblem is composed of a butterfly (possibly a swallowtail) with spread wings, with the uppercase letter K in place of the lower right wing's pattern.

Kako is the leader of Kako Squad and a shooter. She enjoys battles. Jin mentioned her as a candidate for the Fūjin.

Kuroe is a Attacker of Kako Squad. Tsutsumi mentioned her as a prodigy along with Kitora and Midorikawa, having defeated a Neighbor simulation in 11 seconds on her first try.

Kitagawa is a trapper and member of Kako Squad

Kobayakawa is the operator of Kako Squad

Miwa Squad
 is team No. 7 in the A-Rank ranking. Their emblem is composed of two black snakes spiraling around a bullet.

Shūji is an All-Rounder and the captain of Miwa Squad, who joined Border to avenge the death of his sister, who was killed by a Neighbor. Due to his sister's death, he hates Neighbors, not differentiating good ones from evil ones. His main trigger is the Asteroid, which has no special ability on its own but is equipped with the ability , which can bypass shields and immobilize enemies, due to the bullets being very heavy. He was a member of the original Azuma Squad.

Yōsuke is a fun-loving individual who loves a good battle. He's an Attacker. He uses the trigger Gen'yō Kogetsu. Unlike his teammates, he doesn't hate Neighbors, and he wants to have a battle with Yūma just for fun.

Narasaka is the No. 2 Sniper on Border. He harbours a grudge against Neighbors due to his house being destroyed in an invasion. He was mentored by Azuma.

Kodera is a bespectacled boy and another Sniper. He, like Narasaka, had his house destroyed, and thus hates Neighbors.

The Operator of Miwa Squad, and a childhood friend of Kei, who mentored him in tactics. She was mentored by Azuma and was the operator of the original Azuma Squad.

Katagiri Squad
 is team No. 8 in the A-Rank ranking. Their emblem is a Snowflake with a black background.

Katagiri is the No. 3 Gunner, and captain of Katagiri Squad

Ichijō is a Attacker, and member of Katagiri Squad.

Momozono is a Sniper, and member of Katagiri Squad.

Amakura is a member of Katagiri Squad, and the only Spotter in Border.

Yuitsuka is the Operator for Katagiri Squad, and was the Operator for the second generation of Azuma Squad.

B-Rank

Ninomiya Squad
 is team No. 1 in the B-Rank ranking. They were No. 4 in the A-Rank ranking, but were demoted to B-Rank due to Hatohara's defection.

The captain of Ninomiya Squad and Border's No. 1 Shooter, who believes only people stronger than oneself are worthy of respect, but at the same time can respect people he considers weaker, such as Izumi, who he requested to mentor him despite already being Border's No. 1 Shooter back then. He considers Osamu and Chika unfit for the expedition missions. He was a former member of the original Azuma squad, and is constantly being picked on by his former teammate, Kako.

A Gunner and member of Ninomiya Squad. He is smart and crafty, being able to extract information using his word play. Though he seems to be amiable, always with a smile on his face, he is disliked by a few people.

Stoic attacker of the Ninomiya Squad. He is normally quiet and doesn't show emotions on his face, even in battle. He's shy around females and has difficulty communicating with them, other than his team's operator, Hiyami (who he got used to being around), and previously, Hatohara (since she was kind to him from the beginning).

Ninomiya Squad's former sniper, who wanted to be part of the Away Team to find her little brother. Her squad lost the right to join, due to her being unable to shoot people even in their trion bodies, although she was able to disarm them without directly shoot them, but this wasn't enough to join the away team. She later teamed up with civilians and gave them triggers in order to go to the neighborhood, never to appear again. It is theorized Chika's brother Rinji was one of the civilians, as he disappeared in the same day, and talked to Osamu about their plans.

Kageura Squad
 is team No. 3 in the B-Rank ranking, and formerly No. 6 in the A-Rank ranking, but were demoted to B-Rank due to Kageura's violent behavior.

The leader of the Kageura Squad. He caused his Squad to be demoted to B-Rank due to his violent behavior. His side effect allows him to feel other's emotions/intentions towards him as pinpricks; intense emotions to cause harm intensify the pinpricks. He forms a friendly (albeit rocky) rivalry with Yūma following their match. He also mentions that his side effect is useless against Yuma, since he can't detect anything from him. He also dislikes Sumiharu Inukai.

The Sniper of Kageura Squad. He befriends Chika and starts training her since he doesn't want her to have the same fate as his master, Mirai Hatohara, who he was very fond of. He also dislikes Ninomiya Squad, saying it's a feeling shared by his team. He specifically hates Ninomiya, due to the way he treats Hatohara as a traitor. He later has a crush on Chika, and wants to join the away team to protect her.

The Gunner of Kageura Squad. Also known as "Zoe" by his squadmates, Kitazoe is easily moved to tears and very open in his displays of emotion. Nonetheless, he is normally laid-back and level-headed, even in the face of imminent defeat.

The Operator of Kageura Squad. Nire comes across as a very carefree person, bordering on lazy. She spends much of her time at Border under her kotatsu, and, if someone other than her teammates is brought to the strategy room, she will invite them to join her.

Ikoma Squad
 is team No. 4 in the B-Rank ranking.

Ikoma is the No. 6 Attacker, and captain of Ikoma Squad

Oki is a Sniper, and member of Ikoma Squad.

Mizukami is a Shooter, and member of Ikoma Squad.

Kai is a Attacker, and member of Ikoma Squad.

Hosoi is the Operator for Ikoma Squad

Ōji Squad
 is team No. 5 in the B-Rank ranking.

Ōji is a Attacker, and captain of Ōji Squad. He is very adept at strategies but is also full of confidence. As his name suggests (his name meaning "Prince), his behavior is also quite dignified. He gives people nicknames which are usually anglicized forms of their names, for example, calling Chika Amatori as Amatoriciana, however he calls Fumika Teruya, Teruteru.

Kurauchi is a Shooter, and member of Ōji Squad.

Kashio is a Attacker, and member of Ōji Squad.

Kittaka is the operator for Ōji Squad.

Azuma Squad
 is team No. 6 in the B-Rank ranking. The squad has changed all its members except for Azuma himself at least twice before its present composition. 

Haruaki was the first Sniper in Border, and is the captain of Azuma Squad. He is great at tactics and at deciding which gun to use when, which proves him to be a great sniper. He trained Narasaka, Tōma and Reiji, among other snipers of Border, and also tutored Ren Tsukimi in tactics.

Okudera is a Attacker, and a member of the latest generation of Azuma Squad.

Koarai is a Attacker, and a member of the latest generation of Azuma Squad.

Hitomi is the operator for the current Generation of Azuma Squad.

Yuba Squad
 is team No. 8 in the B-Rank ranking.

Yuba is the No. 2 Gunner, and captain of Yuba Squad

Obishima is a All-Rounder, and member of Yuba Squad.

Tonooka is a Sniper, and member of Yuba Squad.

Fujimaru is the Operator for Yuba Squad.

Other agents

A 14 years old C-Rank Sniper who befriends Chika. She's rather foul-mouthed for her age, and a self-described lazy. She seems to like cats, as she has been carrying one on her head ever since Aftokrator's invasion began.

A 16 years old S-Rank agent and Black Trigger user, he has been said to be highly destructive in battle, although his ability has yet to be seen. He can't get himself in the mood during battle as his opponents are too dull for him.

Kōda Squad
 A Trio of C-Rank agents who think very highly of themselves and believe that Arashiyama Squad has no real strength. They're frequently trying to show off, but get constantly beaten up. As they are still C-Rank, they're not an official squad, as only A-Rank and B-Rank agents can form squads. Replica mentions that they are idiots but don't realize that themselves. Their surnames are revealed in their anime credits and their given names in the first databook.

The group's leader, a Shooter who uses Hound.

Another Shooter who uses Hound.

An Attacker who uses Kogetsu.

Civilians

Osamu Mikumo's mother, who has been mistaken for his sister due to her young appearance. She worries a lot about her son, but allowed him to continue working on Border despite him almost dying. She also has the habit of threatening to beat people with a stick, which she found in the river where she does laundry. She is 39 years old.

One of Osamu and Yūma's classmates, a friendly and smart girl with pigtails. She seems to be good friends with Futatsugi.

One of Osamu and Yūma's classmates, a happy and excitable girl who quickly befriends Yūma. She seems to be good friends with Ichinose.

One of Osamu and Yūma's classmates, a noisy and fun-loving boy who is a big fan of Border. He knows a lot about Border and wants to join the organization.

One of Osamu and Yūma's classmates, a calm and level-headed boy. He seems to find Miyoshi's obsession with Border annoying.

A trio of bullies from Osamu and Yūma's classroom. They bully Osamu and Yūma at first, but start fearing them after they find out Osamu is a Border agent and after Yūma scares them away.

Chika's older brother, who seemed to be mistrustful of Border and wanted to protect her on his own. He made Osamu promise that Osamu would protect Chika should something happen to him. He obtained a trigger through an unknown party and wanted to explore the world on the other side together with that party. However, on the day planned for the travel, he mysteriously disappeared, leaving Chika alone and in despair.

Chika's friend, who was the only one who believed her at the time neighbors started chasing her, as at the time Border didn't yet have a base and nobody knew anything about Neighbors. She promised she'd protect Chika, but some time after she mysteriously disappeared. Since then, Chika became afraid of asking others for help and distanced herself from other people. Her name is not revealed in the manga, only in the anime.

Neighbor Worlds
The Neighborhood is divided in many different countries, which are "planets" which follow different orbits, and some which fly around freely. Yūma's father Yūgo calls these countries "Planet States".

Liberi
 is a maritime nation surrounded by a rich, vast sea. Liberi is the Latin word for "children".

Leoforio
 is the cavalry nation which Trion Soldiers as mounts. Leoforio (λεωφορείο leo̱forío) is the Greek word for 'bus'.

Chion
 is a snow country where the harsh terrain and climate thwart enemies from attacking. Chion (χιων chión) means "snow", and is the name of the Greek goddess of snow.

Aftokrator
The god's country and the largest military state. Aftokrator (αυτοκράτωρ af̱tokráto̱r) is the Greek word for "emperor".

He is one of the trigger users of Aftokrator and the commander of their invading army attacking Earth. He is the leader during Aftokrator's invasion and Ranbanein's older brother. He has grey hair and impala-like horns. According to Volume 9, he is a pacifist, and fears Moira. His name Hyrein is the Greek verb for "to take", and the origin for the English word "heresy", while his trigger's name Alektor (αλέκτωρ alékto̱r) is the Greek word for "rooster".

He is one of the trigger users of Aftokrator and a member of their army attacking Earth. He is Hyrein's younger brother. He is a tall figure with what appear to be short ram-like horns and red-brown hair. His name Ranbanein (λαμβάνειν lamvánein) is the present active infinitive of the Greek verb Lamvano (λαμβάνω lambánō), "to take/receive", while his trigger's name Chelidon (χελιδόνι chelidóni) is the Greek word for "swallow".

He is one of the trigger users of Aftokrator and a member of their army attacking Earth. He also has short but thick horns protruding away from his head and sandy-blonde hair. He is much younger than the other trigger users of Aftokrator. After the Aftokrator invaders were forced to stop their invasion sooner due to Osamu and Replica's efforts and failed to capture Chika to make her Aftokrator's new god, he was left stranded on Earth as part of Hyrein's original plan to sacrifice his master should they not find a suitable god, and became a captive of Tamakoma Branch. After failing to return to Aftokrator with the soldiers from Galopoula, Hyuse decides to join Tamakoma-2 in hopes to join the expedition and return to Aftokrator. Despite this, he refuses to give Border information about Aftokrator. His trigger's name Lampyris (λαμπυρίς lampyrís) is the Greek word for "firefly".

He is one of the trigger users of Aftokrator and a member of their invading army attacking Earth. He has dark hair and long dark deer-like horns and squinty, shifty eyes. His right eye's iris has become black, which, along with his defiant personality, are said by Mira to have been caused by his trigger , which makes him capable of liquefying and gasifying to attack his enemy in multiple ways. He is killed by Moira in order to recover Vorvoros, but his horns, which retain his memories and personality due to rooting to his brain, are implanted in a Rad, which becomes black, reviving him. Unlike Hyuse, he is much more willing to give information to Border about Aftokrator, due to their betrayal. His name Enedora (ενέδρα enédra) is the Greek word for "ambush", while his trigger's name Vorvoros (βορβορος vórvoros) is the Greek word for "mud".

He is one of the trigger users of Aftokrator and a commander of their invading army attacking Earth. He is an elderly man with grey hair and no horns. He was defeated by Yūma, a feat which impressed both Hyrein and Mira. His trigger's name Organon (Ὄργανον Órganon) is the Greek word for "instrument", or "tool". It is a book written by Aristotle, and the collection of his six works on logic.

She is one of the trigger users of Aftokrator and member of the invading army attacking Earth. She is a young woman with short red hair and short black horns on her forehead. She is the group's support. According to Volume 9, she is a sadist, and feared by Hairein. Out of political alliance of her and Hyrein's family, she is slated to either marry him or Ranbanein. Her name Mira (μοίρα, moíra) is the Greek word for "fate", while her trigger's name Speiraskia is a combination of the Greek words speira (σπείρα speíra, spiral) and skia (σκια skia, shadow) which means "spiralling shadow".

Calvaria
 is the fortress nation supported by Yūgo and Yūma because the self-defense commander of Calvaria was an old friend of Yūgo's. Calvaria is the Latin name for Calvary, where Jesus was crucified in the Bible. It is also the upper part of the neurocranium (skullcap). The citizens' names come from characters of Doraemon, a series which Ashihara is a confessed fan of and which is one of the inspirations of World Trigger.

He is the self-defense leader of the nation of Calvaria and a close friend of Yūma's father, Yūgo. He's named after Doraemon himself.

Raymond's daughter and Vittarno's older sister. She's named after Shizuka Minamoto.

Raymond's son and Izukacha's younger brother. He's named after Nobita Nobi.

Spinthir
 is a mid-sized border nation that attacked the country of Calvaria and also hired assassins to support their trigger users during an attack in Calvaria. Spinthir (σπινθήρ, spinthí̱r) is the Greek word for "spark".

Mysterious Assassin
This is a shadowy figure who targets trigger users of Calvaria during the invasion by Spinthir, and also killed Yūma.

Galopoula

Rodochroun

Trion Soldiers
 are automated robotic soldiers developed for different purposes, ranging from surveillance to human/trion harvesting and to combat.

These are giant quadrupedal worm-like beasts. They are more than able fighters on their own with good body armor and powerful swings of its body or attacks by its huge mouth.

Marmots are bug like trion soldiers with the hardest blades of any of the Neighbor monsters. These units are built for melee combat as demonstrated by their speed and agility. They're small but tough to beat.

These giant trion soldiers fly and are used for bombardment and turn even more dangerous if critically damaged.
Rad
Rads are the spy units of Trion Soldiers from the other world. They are also capable of creating gateways by gathering trion of passersby. They appear similar to a cross between spiders crabs but are silver and white in color with a red or orange eye-like aperture on both its front and on its back, though the one on its back is slightly different. One probably acts as vision while the other generates gates. They have 6 legs and a tail.

These are multi-story level worm like creatures tasked with capturing humans in the Earth world for the other world nations. They are not combat grade creatures like most of the trion soldiers invading from the other world. Though it's combat oriented, it is capable of defense by ranged attacks from its mouth.

A tadpole shrimp looking Trion Soldier.

These tall humanoid like shaped trion soldiers are probably the toughest of them all and are designed solely for capturing trigger users. They are the mysterious "new type" seen during the invasion of the city. They are white, with rabbit like ears which are actually some type of radar sensors. In their stomachs are claws for catching which curl back into the chest cavity for form a makeshift cage for those captured. On their heads are eyes that can also shoot ranged attacks. Each of them is heavily armored, especially on the back, head, and arms.

One of the two types of trion soldierrs given to Galopoula by Rhodokhroun. As the name suggests, they resemble dogs. They commonly fight in packs, and are also used as surveillance.

The other of the two types of trion soldiers given to Galopoula by Rhodokhroun. It has a roughly humanoid shape with a hunched posture. It is specialized in group combat.

References

World Trigger
World Trigger